Mária Vadász, née Vanya (1 January 1950 – 18 August 2009) was a Hungarian handball player, Olympic bronze medalist and World Championship silver medalist.

She died in Budapest on 18 August 2009 at the age of 59.

Achievements
Nemzeti Bajnokság I:
Winner: 1972, 1973, 1974, 1975, 1976, 1977, 1978, 1979, 1980, 1982, 1984
Magyar Kupa:
Winner: 1971, 1974, 1976, 1978, 1979, 1980, 1982
Champions Cup:
Winner: 1982
Finalist: 1978, 1979
Olympic Games:
Bronze Medalist: 1976
World Championship:
Silver Medalist: 1982
Bronze Medalist: 1975, 1978

Awards
 Hungarian Handballer of the Year: 1977

References

External links
Profile on Database Olympics

1950 births
2009 deaths
Hungarian female handball players
Handball players at the 1976 Summer Olympics
Handball players at the 1980 Summer Olympics
Olympic handball players of Hungary
Olympic bronze medalists for Hungary
Olympic medalists in handball
Medalists at the 1976 Summer Olympics
Sportspeople from Komárom-Esztergom County